Amt Temnitz is an Amt ("collective municipality") in the district of Ostprignitz-Ruppin, in Brandenburg, Germany. Its seat is in Walsleben.

The Amt Temnitz consists of the following municipalities:
Dabergotz
Märkisch Linden
Storbeck-Frankendorf
Temnitzquell
Temnitztal
Walsleben

Demography

References

Temnitz
Ostprignitz-Ruppin